Lau Cheok-vá  is a Macanese politician, serving as the President of the Legislative Assembly of Macau. He is also currently serving as Deputy to the 11th National People’s Congress of the People’s Republic of China, Vice-President of Macao Federation of Trade Unions and President of Judicial Officers Recommendation Commission. Previously he served as Vice-President of the Legislative Assembly from 1999 until 2009.

Election results

See also
 Court of Final Appeal (Macau)
 Politics of Macau

References

Living people
Macau judges
Members of the Legislative Assembly of Macau
1945 births
Jinan University alumni